Seagrim is a surname which may refer to: 
Derek Seagrim (1903–1943), British soldier, recipient of the Victoria Cross
Hugh Seagrim (1909–1944), British soldier, recipient of the George Cross
Molly "Moll" Seagrim, fictional character in English novel The History of Tom Jones (1749)

See also
Seagrim, a house of Norwich School, named after Derek and Hugh Seagrim